St Mary's Church, Carisbrooke is a parish church in the Church of England located in Carisbrooke, Isle of Wight.

History

The church is medieval dating from the Norman period.
The tower contains a ring of 10 bells. The back 8 bells were cast in 1921 by Gillet and Johnston, Croydon and were made a ring of 10 in 2002 by the Whitchapel Bell Foundry.
The church is home to the funeral monument of Margaret Seymour, Lady Wadham, aunt to Queen Jane Seymour, and second wife to Sir Nicholas I Wadham, Captain of the Isle of Wight from 1509 to 1520.

Church status

The church is grouped with the Church of St Nicholas in Castro, Carisbrooke.

Incumbents

Alexander Ross, prolific Scottish writer and controversialist, was vicar of Carisbrooke from 1634 until his death in 1654.

Burials
Lady Wadham, 1520
William Keeling, 1619 (discoverer of the Keeling Islands in the Indian Ocean)
Sir William Stephens, 1697

Organ

The church has a two manual organ dating from 1908 by Bevington. A specification of the organ can be found on the National Pipe Organ Register.

List of organists

John T. Read ca. 1912

References

Church of England church buildings on the Isle of Wight